Piero Natoli (22 November 1947 – 8 May 2001) was an Italian actor, director and screenwriter.

Born in Rome, Natoli entered the cinema industry as an assistant director to Marco Bellocchio. After an intense career as a documentarist for RAI, in 1980 he debuted as director and actor with Armonica a bocca. Between the second half of 1980s and the early 2000s he had an intense career as a character actor, working with Gabriele Muccino, Paolo Virzì, Marco Risi, Carlo Verdone and Antonello Grimaldi, among others. He died of an intracranial aneurysm. His daughter Carlotta Natoli is also an actress.

References

External links 

1947 births
2001 deaths
Male actors from Rome
Italian male stage actors
Italian male film actors
Italian male television actors
Italian film directors
20th-century Italian screenwriters
Italian male screenwriters
People of Sicilian descent
20th-century Italian male actors
20th-century Italian male writers
Neurological disease deaths in Lazio
Deaths from intracranial aneurysm